Leibsch is a locality (ortsteil) in the municipality (gemeinde) of  Unterspreewald in the German state (land) of Brandenburg. It is located on the River Spree in the Spreewald.

Municipalities in Brandenburg